UNESCO's Memory of the World (MoW) Programme is an international initiative launched to safeguard the documentary heritage of humanity against collective amnesia, neglect, decay over time and climatic conditions, as well as deliberate destruction. It calls for the preservation of valuable archival holdings, library collections, and private individual compendia all over the world for posterity, the reconstitution of dispersed or displaced documentary heritage, and  increased accessibility to, and dissemination of, these items.

Overview
The Memory of the World Register is a compendium of documents, manuscripts, oral traditions, audio-visual materials, library, and archival holdings of universal value. Inscription on the Register leads to improved conservation of the documentary heritage by calling upon the program's networks of experts to exchange information and raise resources for the preservation, digitization, and dissemination of the material. The program also uses technology to provide wider accessibility and diffusion of the items inscribed on the Register.

Any organization or individual can nominate a documentary item for inscription on the Register via UNESCO Member States through their National Commission for UNESCO or, in the absence of a National Commission, the relevant government body in charge of relations with UNESCO, involving, if one exists, the relevant national MoW committee. Two proposals per UNESCO Member State are considered in each nomination cycle, joint nomination proposals from two or more UNESCO Member States are unlimited. During its meetings, the International Advisory Council (IAC) examines the full documentation of the item's description, origin, world significance, and contemporary state of conservation. The IAC recommends to the Executive Board of UNESCO the items proposed for inscription.

History
In 1992, the program began as a way to preserve and promote documentary heritage, which can be a single document, a collection, a holding or an archival fonds that is deemed to be of such significance as to transcend the boundaries of time and culture. This recorded memory reflects the diversity of languages, people, and cultures. UNESCO, the world agency responsible for the protection of the world's cultural and natural heritage, realized the need to protect such fragile yet important component of cultural heritage. The Memory of the World Programme was established to preserve and digitize humanity's documentary heritage.

The program is administered by the International Advisory Committee (IAC), whose 14 members are appointed by the Director-General of UNESCO. The IAC is responsible for the formulation of major policies, including the technical, legal and financial framework for the program. Regular meetings were held by the IAC in its interim capacity beginning in 1993 to sustain the momentum gained by the program, culminating in the creation of the Memory of the World Register during its second meeting in 1995, with the inaugural batch of documents being inscribed on the Register in 1997, after the statutes that created the IAC as a standing committee took effect.
The IAC also maintains several subsidiary bodies:
 Bureau: Maintains an overview of the Programme between IAC meetings and makes tactical decisions in liaison with the Secretariat, reviews the use of the Memory of the World logo, and liaises with national Memory of the World committees and monitors their growth and operation.
 Technical Sub-Committee: Develops, regularly revises and promulgates information guides on the preservation of documentary heritage, and offers advice on technical and preservation matters.
 Marketing Sub-Committee: Develops strategies for awareness raising and for increasing financial support for Memory of the World, implements a marketing plan, and compiles and reviews guidelines for the use of the Memory of the World logo.
 Register Sub-Committee: Oversees the assessment of nominations for the Memory of the World International Register and provides recommendations, with reasons, for their inscription or rejection to each meeting of the IAC.

Memory of the World International Register
The Memory of the World International Register is a compendium of the world's documentary heritage – such as manuscripts, oral traditions, audio-visual materials, and library and archive holdings. It catalogues documentary heritage that has been recommended by the International Advisory Committee, and endorsed by the Director-General of UNESCO, according to the selection criteria regarding "world significance and outstanding universal value."

The first inscriptions on the UNESCO Memory of the World Register were made in 1997. Following the successful establishment of the Register, UNESCO and the Memory of the World Programme have encouraged the creation of national and regional organizations – presumably in part to streamline applications and fundraising – as well as national and regional registers, which are to focus on documentary heritage of great regional or national importance, but not necessarily of global importance.

Among the various properties in the Register include recordings of folk music; ancient languages and phonetics; aged remnants of religious and secular manuscripts; collective lifetime works of renowned giants of literature; science and music; copies of landmark motion pictures and short films; and accounts documenting changes in the world's political, economic, and social stage.

As of December 2018, 432 documentary heritages had been inscribed in the Register, with 274 of these from Europe and North America and 116 from Asia and the Pacific. In the Asia-Pacific region, in 2014–2015, there were 18 member nations of MOWCAP (6 without national committees), while in 2016, there were 16 national MOW committees.

The program is not without controversy. During the 2015 cycle, for example, there was a significant degree of conflict within East Asia, as registry with the MOW Program was becoming viewed as an approval of particular views of contested history, specifically with respect to the Nanjing Massacre and the comfort women.

Top 10 countries by number of inscriptions

Memory of the World IAC meetings

Biennial meetings of the International Advisory Committee are used to discuss and inscribe items onto the Register. The meeting takes place every odd year:

Jikji Prize

The Jikji Prize was established in 2004 in cooperation with the South Korean government to further promote the objectives of the Memory of the World Programme, and to commemorate the 2001 inscription of the country's Jikji on the Register. The award, which includes a cash prize of $30,000 from the Korean government, recognizes institutions that have contributed to the preservation and accessibility of documentary heritage.

The prize has been awarded biennially since 2005 during the meeting of the IAC.

Recipients
 2005: Czech National Library (Prague)
 2007: Phonogrammarchiv of the Austrian Academy of Sciences
 2009: National Archives of Malaysia (Kuala Lumpur)
 2011: National Archives of Australia
 2013: Apoyo al Desarrollo de Archivos y Bibliotecas (Mexico City)
 2016: Iberarchivos Programme for the Development of Ibero-Ameran Archives
 2018: SAVAMA-DCI (Mali)
2020: Tuol Sleng Genocide Museum (Cambodia)
2022: American University in Cairo’s Libraries and Learning Technologies, Rare Books and Special Collection Library in Egypt

See also 
 Digital preservation
 Domesday Project
 National memory
 Project Gutenberg
 World Heritage Site

Footnotes

References

External links

 UNESCO Memory of the World Programme
 UNESCO Memory of the World Register

 
UNESCO
Cultural heritage conservation
1992 establishments
1992 introductions
1995 introductions